Danville National Cemetery can refer to any of three United States National Cemeteries:

 Danville National Cemetery (Illinois), Danville, Illinois
 Danville National Cemetery (Kentucky), Danville, Kentucky
 Danville National Cemetery (Virginia), Danville, Virginia